Fouilloy is a railway station located in the commune of Fouilloy in the Oise department, France. The station is served by TER Hauts-de-France trains from Amiens to Abancourt.

According to the SNCF, the station averaged 3 passengers per operating day in 2003.

See also
List of SNCF stations in Hauts-de-France

References

Railway stations in Oise